Woodmancott is a village in the City of Winchester district of Hampshire, England. The village is notable for Blissfields Festival, hosted each summer at Vicarage Farm since 2011.

Governance
The village is part of the civil parish of Micheldever and is part of the City of Winchester non-metropolitan district of Hampshire County Council.

References

Villages in Hampshire